M. Mansur Ali was a Jatiya Party (Ershad) politician and the former Member of Parliament of Satkhira-4.

Career
Ali was elected to parliament from Satkhira-4 as a Jatiya Party candidate in 1988. He had served as the State Minister of Textiles in 1979.

Death
Ali died in 2003.

References

Jatiya Party politicians
2003 deaths
4th Jatiya Sangsad members
2nd Jatiya Sangsad members